Mathias Klotz Germain (born 13 April 1965) is a Chilean architect. He was studied at the Faculty of Architecture of the Pontifical Catholic University of Chile, where he graduated in 1991. Winner of the Borromini Prize of Architecture in 2001 for under-40 architects.

Klotz together with Alejandro Aravena are among the most renowned Chilean architects of the early 21st century. His work, elegant and rooted in the Modernist tradition, has put him on the international spotlight. He is the Dean of the Faculty of Architecture of the Diego Portales University in Santiago, Chile.

His work, which has been published in international architectural magazines, includes:

 Casa Klotz, Tongoy, Chile. 1993.
 Casa Reutter, Cachagua, Chile. 1999.
 Colegio Altamira, Santiago, Chile. 2000.
 Casa Ponce, Buenos Aires, Argentina. 2001–03.

References

External links
Official website

Chilean architects
Chilean people of German descent
People from Viña del Mar
1965 births
Living people
Pontifical Catholic University of Chile alumni